The Haiti Fed Cup team represents Haiti in Fed Cup tennis competition and are governed by the Fédération Haïtienne de Tennis.  They have not competed since 1999.

History
Haiti competed in its first Fed Cup in 1998.  Their best result was finishing seventh in Group II in their debut year.

See also
Fed Cup
Haiti Davis Cup team

External links

Billie Jean King Cup teams
Fed Cup
Fed Cup